The smooth chameleon (Chamaeleo laevigatus) is a species of chameleon native to Africa. It is bluish-green and has small scales. Its body is very slender, and it looks similar to Chamaeleo senegalensis.

Distribution 

Found mostly in the lowlands, Chamaeleo laevigatus lives throughout much of sub-Saharan Africa. Specimens have been found in Burundi, Rwanda, Kenya, Sudan, South Sudan, Uganda, Tanzania, the Democratic Republic of the Congo, Central African Republic, Zambia, Eritrea, Ethiopia, and Cameroon.

References 

Chamaeleo
Lizards of Africa
Reptiles described in 1863
Taxa named by John Edward Gray